Menteş can refer to:

 Menteş, Çivril
 Menteş, Sandıklı